Jum Jainudin Akbar (3 September 1963 – 11 November 2016) was a Filipina politician who had served two terms as provincial governor of Basilan.  She was the widow of deceased strongman Wahab Akbar. Akbar, along with other Mindanao governors, had a hand in supporting the Bangsamoro Basic Law.

Political career
Akbar was the first female governor of the Province of Basilan, and was elected during the May 2007 elections.  However, Jum had substantial political experience as a result of her years as an active political partner to her husband and predecessor, Wahab Akbar.  Upon election, Gov. Akbar pledged to fulfill a campaign promise of providing free rubber trees, fertilizers and polybags to farmers of the region, at a cost of thirty million pesos or more. In her first term as governor, an IED went off near her home. The explosion was thought by authorities to be linked to politics. Akbar also handled the evacuation and retrieval operations at Al Barka after the July 2007 massacre of Philippine Army troops by rebel ambush during her tenure. She died in office on 11 November 2016.

Akbar was described to be soft-spoken and cool, but highly competent.  According to her official bio, she had both "a male competitive capacity and female collaborative capability," giving her the strength to tailor her leadership style to suit individual cases or situations.

She was survived by her son, Al-Qauid.

References

2016 deaths
Governors of Basilan
Members of the House of Representatives of the Philippines from Basilan
Lakas–CMD politicians
Liberal Party (Philippines) politicians
People from Basilan
Women members of the House of Representatives of the Philippines
Burials at the Manila Memorial Park – Sucat
21st-century Filipino women politicians
21st-century Filipino politicians
Women provincial governors of the Philippines
Filipino Muslims
1963 births